Giovanni Battista Mongelli (born 8 June 1957 in Foggia), better known as Gianni Mongelli, is an Italian politician.

He is a member of the Democratic Party and served as Mayor of Foggia from June 2009 to June 2014.

See also
2009 Italian local elections
List of mayors of Foggia

References

External links
 

1957 births
Living people
Mayors of places in Apulia
People from Foggia
Democratic Party (Italy) politicians